Øystein Gåre (30 June 1954 – 18 September 2010) was a Norwegian football coach. He is best known to have led FK Bodø/Glimt to silver medals in both the Norwegian Premier League and the Norwegian Football Cup in 2003; for this Gåre received the Kniksen award as coach of the year. In November 2006, Gåre was hired as the new coach for the Norway national under-21 football team.

Gåre died on 18 September 2010, 56 years old.

References

1954 births
2010 deaths
Norwegian football managers
FK Bodø/Glimt managers
Kniksen Award winners